Stephen P. Synnott (born 1946) is an American astronomer and Voyager scientist at JPL, and expert in spacecraft optical navigation techniques. He has discovered several natural satellites of outer Solar System planets such as Metis, Puck, Larissa (recovered), Cressida, Thebe and Proteus.

Honors 

The minor planet 6154 Stevesynnott, discovered by Henry E. Holt in 1990, was named in his honour. The approved naming citation was published by the Minor Planet Center on 1 July 1996.

References 
 

1946 births
American astronomers
Planetary scientists
Living people